Merete Mazzarella  (born February 4, 1945 in Helsinki) is a Swedo-Finnish prize-winning author and literature researcher.

Life and work 
Mazzarella's mother was Danish, and father a Finnish ambassador. Her father's mother tongue was Finnish, but they spoke Swedish at home for practical reasons. Mazzarella learnt about Finland Swedish culture through literature. 

She acquired her doctorate in 1981 on the subject of Swedish Nobel laureate Eyvind Johnson. Mazzarella held a temporary professorship in Nordic literature at Helsinki University from 1995 to 1998 and was a permanent professor from 1998 to 2008.

Mazzarella has written for Hufvudstadsbladet in Finland, as well as Sydsvenska Dagbladet and Dagens Nyheter in Sweden. 

Mazzarella is since 2012 married to Lars Hertzberg.

Awards 
 2008,  (Vuoden tiedekirja) for Fredrik Charlotta Född Tengström: en nationalskalds hustru about Fredrika Runeberg, the wife of J. L. Runeberg
 2009, nominated for the Finlandia Prize for Ingen saknad, ingen sorg: en dag i Zacharias Topelius liv
 2015, Mazzarella's Själens nattsida was nominated for the 2015 Runeberg Prize
 2021, Mazzarella was awarded the Swedish Academy Finland Prize

References

External links 
 

1945 births
Living people
Swedish-speaking Finns
Writers from Helsinki
People from Uusimaa
Writers from Uusimaa
Finnish writers in Swedish
20th-century Finnish novelists
20th-century Finnish women writers
21st-century Finnish writers
21st-century Finnish women writers
Finnish people of Danish descent